Toledo Window Box is the sixth album released by comedian George Carlin, and the fourth on the Little David label (distributed by Warner Bros. Records in this one instance; Carlin's other Little David albums were released by Warner Communications' Atlantic Records label). It was recorded on July 20, 1974 at the Paramount Theater in Oakland, California, and released in November of that year. It was also included as part of the 1999 The Little David Years box set.

Toledo Window Box is a type of marijuana that Carlin said that a man once offered him - an antithesis to pot names like "Acapulco Gold" and "Colombian Red". This was Carlin's fourth and final gold album.

The front cover features Carlin wearing a white T-shirt with a planter growing marijuana plants, pointing his thumbs back at it, while the back cover shows Carlin wearing almost the same shirt but with the plants gone, while standing there red-eyed and looking "high". The illustration on the t-shirt was done by Drew Struzan, who went on to become a notable illustrator of album covers and movie posters. The version of the album in The Little David Years boxset includes a slip to put the CD in, which shows a picture of a burning joint. The sleeve could also pass as a rolling paper.

The name Toledo Window Box refers to a report Carlin read stating that the chief of police of Toledo, Ohio had gone to see a viewing of Reefer Madness'' and a training session by the FBI. Afterwards he made the statement that "You can grow enough marijuana in an average window box to drive the entire population of Toledo stark, raving mad". Carlin then stated that he wanted one of those Toledo Window Boxes.

Track listing

References

1974 live albums
George Carlin live albums
Stand-up comedy albums
1970s comedy albums
Little David Records live albums